The 159th New York State Legislature, consisting of the New York State Senate and the New York State Assembly, met from January 1 to May 13, 1936, during the fourth year of Herbert H. Lehman's governorship, in Albany.

Background
Under the provisions of the New York Constitution of 1894, re-apportioned in 1917, 51 Senators and 150 assemblymen were elected in single-seat districts; senators for a two-year term, assemblymen for a one-year term. The senatorial districts consisted either of one or more entire counties; or a contiguous area within a single county. The counties which were divided into more than one senatorial district were New York (nine districts), Kings (eight), Bronx (three), Erie (three), Monroe (two), Queens (two) and Westchester (two). The Assembly districts were made up of contiguous area, all within the same county.

At this time there were two major political parties: the Democratic Party and the Republican Party. The Socialist Party and the Communist Party also nominated tickets. In New York City, a "City Fusion" and a "Jeffersonian" ticket were also nominated.

Elections
The New York state election, 1935, was held on November 5. No statewide elective offices were up for election.

Assemblywomen Doris I. Byrne (Dem.), a lawyer from the Bronx, and Jane H. Todd (Rep.), of Tarrytown, were re-elected.

Sessions
The Legislature met for the regular session at the State Capitol in Albany on January 1, 1936; and adjourned on May 13.

Irving M. Ives (Rep.) was elected Speaker.

State Senate

Districts

Members
The asterisk (*) denotes members of the previous Legislature who continued in office as members of this Legislature. Jacob H. Livingston and Harry F. Dunkel changed from the Assembly to the Senate.

Note: For brevity, the chairmanships omit the words "...the Committee on (the)..."

Employees
 Clerk: James J. Reilly

State Assembly

Assemblymen

Note: For brevity, the chairmanships omit the words "...the Committee on (the)..."

Employees
 Clerk: Ansley B. Borkowski
 Secretary to the Speaker: Truman G. Searle

Notes

Sources
 Members of the New York Assembly (1930s) at Political Graveyard
 Members of Legislature—1936 in The State Employee (February 1936, Vol. 5, No. 2, pg. 10, 12 and 15)
 Moffat to Get Ways–Means Post in G.O.P. Harmony Move in the New York Post on January 6, 1936
 Moffat Heads Ways and Means Comm. in the Plattsburgh Daily Press, of Plattsburgh, on January 7, 1936
 Republican Bolters Suffer No Reprisals at Hands of Speaker in The Niagara Falls Gazette, of Niagara Falls, on January 19, 1937

159
1936 in New York (state)
1936 U.S. legislative sessions